"The Telltale Moozadell" is the 35th episode of the HBO original series The Sopranos and the ninth of the show's third season. It was written by Michael Imperioli and directed by Dan Attias, and originally aired on April 22, 2001.

Starring
 James Gandolfini as Tony Soprano
 Lorraine Bracco as Jennifer Melfi
 Edie Falco as Carmela Soprano
 Michael Imperioli as Christopher Moltisanti
 Dominic Chianese as Corrado Soprano, Jr. *
 Steven Van Zandt as Silvio Dante
 Tony Sirico as Paulie Gualtieri
 Jamie-Lynn Sigler as Meadow Soprano
 Robert Iler as Anthony Soprano, Jr.
 Drea de Matteo as Adriana La Cerva
 Aida Turturro as Janice Soprano
 Federico Castelluccio as Furio Giunta
 John Ventimiglia as Artie Bucco
 Joe Pantoliano as Ralph Cifaretto

* = credit only

Guest starring
 Jerry Adler as Hesh Rabkin

Also guest starring
 Tom Aldredge as Hugh De Angelis
 Sharon Angela as Rosalie Aprile
 Max Casella as Benny Fazio
 Jason Cerbone as Jackie Aprile, Jr.
 Louis Crugnali as Carlo Renzi
 Andrew Davoli as Dino Zerilli
 Stefani Germanotta as teenage girl (uncredited; later known as Lady Gaga)
 Will McCormack as Jason LaPenna
 Turk Pipkin as Aaron Arkaway
 Annabella Sciorra as Gloria Trillo
 Suzanne Shepherd as Mary De Angelis
 Nick Tarabay as Matush

Synopsis
A.J. and some friends break into their high school one night and go swimming. Some of them break into a teacher's office, throw supplies into the pool, and smash the trophy case. The police trace a custom pizza left at the scene to them. There is a conference between the school principal and the football coach, and Tony and Carmela with A.J. The Sopranos are surprised, and Carmela is angry, that A.J.'s punishment is going to be suspended because of his improved academic performance, and because it is in "his best interest – and the team's" for him to continue playing football. The principal says that any punishment should now be decided by the parents; they ground A.J. for a month with extra chores, such as cleaning the gutters.

Carmela is delighted with the large sapphire ring Tony gives her for her birthday. She later asks, "Is there anything you need to tell me?"

Tony is teased, provoked, thrilled, and fascinated by Gloria. At her request, he takes her to the zoo, and they have sex in the deserted reptile house. In a hotel room, undressing him, she is thrilled to find his gun. She says ironically, "Mr. Waste Management!" At her next session with Dr. Melfi she speaks of her happiness. Melfi asks about the man's voice she heard when Gloria last phoned her; Gloria seems offended and answers evasively. Melfi reminds Gloria that she attempted suicide when her last relationship failed. At Tony's next session he says that he had a very successful week and gives Melfi a bonus on top of his regular payment. She tries to refuse it, but he insists. She knows she is being lied to.

Carmela has begun to approve of Jackie Jr. as a romantic partner for Meadow, as he is helpful around the house and bonds with A.J., mentoring him in football. In a heart-to-heart with Tony, Jackie promises that he will work hard. Later, Tony runs into him at an illegal casino and angrily rebukes him, saying emphatically, "If you're spending time with my daughter, I want the best from you." 

The Soprano family takes over a nightclub. Christopher tells Adriana that she will be the owner/manager. She renames it "Crazy Horse." On the club's opening night, Matush Giamona is caught dealing ecstasy in the bathroom and thrown out. Jackie tells Matush that he and Chris are associates. He asks Chris to let his friend Matush continue dealing inside the club; Chris dismisses him. Jackie then tells Matush that Chris permits him to deal outside the club. He does so and is badly beaten up by Furio and his men. At home, Jackie asks Ralphie for a "piece" and, without much questioning, Ralphie gives him a .38 revolver.

First appearances
 Matush Giamona: Drug-dealer who hangs around the Crazy Horse.

Title reference
 The episode's title is a play on Edgar Allan Poe's short story "The Tell-Tale Heart." Moozadell is rough Italian-American slang for mozzarella cheese (which is commonly used on pizza), but can also be used as a derogatory name for an Italian man, according to Michael Imperioli.
 The title refers to Jackie Aprile, Jr.'s dishonest dealings with Tony and Matush.
 The title refers to A.J.'s custom-made pizza with extra mozzarella cheese—which led to him and his friends being caught for vandalizing the pool.
 The episode features repeated references to Jackie Aprile, Jr.'s paper on Edgar Allan Poe.

Cultural references
 AJ gives Carmela a DVD of The Matrix for her birthday
 When Jackie Aprile, Jr. hears the petition of Carlo and Matush, he strikes a pose modeled on Vito Corleone, played by Marlon Brando, in The Godfather and a younger Vito Corleone, played by Robert De Niro, in The Godfather Part II 
 The sapphire ring Tony gives Carmela is from Harry Winston.
 When Meadow is at home asking her parents for a car, the NPR show Car Talk is playing in the background.
 The band Fear Factory is referenced both on a poster in the Crazy Horse and on a hat worn by AJ. He also wears Machine Head and Pantera hoodies.
 As Gloria unbuttons Tony's pants, he half-sings, "Her name is G...", referring to the Them song "Gloria".
 The questioning of the pizza shop staff by the police officers is a spoof of the old Dragnet TV series.
 While Chris is showing Adriana The Lollipop Club, he references The Stone Pony

Production
 Michael Imperioli mentions that series creator, David Chase, is an avid W. C. Fields fan, and in one scene in this episode, Tony is watching It's a Gift. Also in the season 1 episode "46 Long," Tony performs an impression of Fields from The Bank Dick.
 In real life, The Lollipop Club was once owned by Vincent Pastore, who played Big Pussy Bonpensiero in the series.
  A.J.'s birthday present to Carmela is a copy of The Matrix (1999), which prominently features Joe Pantoliano (who plays Ralph Cifaretto) as Cypher.
 Beginning with this episode, Iler and Sigler are listed separately in the opening credits, instead of simultaneously.

Music 
"Con te partirò" ("With you I will leave" or sung in English as "Time to Say Goodbye"), by Andrea Bocelli, is played during the dinner after the singing of "Happy Birthday" to Carmela. It is a recurring song throughout the early seasons of The Sopranos.
"I Will Follow You" by Percy Faith and His Orchestra plays as Carmela and Rosalie dine at Nuovo Vesuvio.
At The Crazy Horse, "The Miami Relatives" band is portrayed by SCOUT.
The song playing at the Bada Bing, when Chris is talking to Sil and then Jackie, is "Girl" by the band Vue (formerly Bellavista).
The song playing at the gambling club is "Black Hearted Woman" by The Allman Brothers Band from their first album.
The song playing while Tony is with Gloria in the hotel room is "Make No Mistake" by Keith Richards, from Live at the Hollywood Palladium, December 15, 1988.
The song played over the end credits is "I (Who Have Nothing)" by Ben E. King.

References

External links
"The Telltale Moozadell" at HBO

The Sopranos (season 3) episodes
2001 American television episodes
Lady Gaga
Television episodes directed by Dan Attias